Andrelis Pashaj (born 11 March 1987, in Fier) is an Albanian footballer who most recently played for Turbina Cërrik in the Albanian First Division.

References

External links
 Profile - FSHF

1987 births
Living people
Sportspeople from Fier
Association football defenders
Albanian footballers
KF Skënderbeu Korçë players
FK Partizani Tirana players
FK Kukësi players
Luftëtari Gjirokastër players
FK Dinamo Tirana players
KS Kastrioti players
KS Sopoti Librazhd players
KS Burreli players
KS Turbina Cërrik players
Kategoria Superiore players
Kategoria e Parë players